Sobal is a surname. Notable people with the surname include:
 Alyaksandr Sobal (born 1982), Belarusian footballer
 Yauhen Sobal (born 1981), Belarusian cyclist

See also
Sobol (surname)

Belarusian-language surnames